Garrett Bradley may refer to:
 Garrett Bradley (filmmaker)
 Garrett Bradley (politician)